Chanthaburi can refer to:

Chanthaburi, a town in eastern Thailand
Chanthaburi Province, the province based at the town
Mueang Chanthaburi District, the district around the town
Chanthaburi Mountains, a mountain range in eastern Thailand
Chanthaburi River, a river in eastern Thailand
Roman Catholic Diocese of Chanthaburi, the diocese covering eastern Thailand
Monthon Chanthaburi, a former administrative subdivision of Thailand under the monthon system